The Indian union territory of Jammu and Kashmir consists of two divisions: Jammu Division and Kashmir Division, and is further divided into 20 by merging various districts 
districts:

History

Princely state of Jammu and Kashmir 

Prior to 1947, Kashmir was a princely state under the paramountcy of the British Indian Empire. The central part of the princely state was administratively divided into the provinces Jammu and Kashmir. In addition there were frontier districts and semi-autonomous jagirs (principalities). They were subdivided as follows:

 Kashmir province: Districts of Srinagar, Anantnag, Baramulla and Muzaffarabad. (Muzzafarabad later became part of Azad Kashmir.)
 Internal jagirs: Poonch (half of it later became part of Azad Kashmir), Chenani and Bhaderwah
Jammu province: Districts of Jammu, Udhampur and Mirpur (later became part of Azad Kashmir)
 Frontier districts:
Ladakh district with three sub-districts: Leh, Kargil and Skardu (Skardu later became part of Gilgit-Baltistan.)
 Gilgit district with two sub-districts: Gilgit and Astore. (Both later became part of Gilgit-Baltistan.)
 Frontier ilaqas comprising Punial, Ishkoman, Yasin, Kuh Ghizar, Hunza, Nagar and Chilas. (All of these regions later became part of Gilgit-Baltistan.)

The Gilgit district and the frontier ilaqas were administered by the British administration as the Gilgit Agency, which were returned to the princely state prior to the Partition of India.

Partition 

After the partition of India and subsequent independence of India and Pakistan, in October 1947, following a rebellion coupled with a tribal invasion from newly independent Pakistan, the Maharaja of Jammu and Kashmir acceded to India in return for armed assistance. India and Pakistan fought the First Kashmir War that lasted through 1948, at the end of which large parts of the three western districts of Mirpur, Poonch and Muzaffarabad, the whole of the Gilgit Agency and the Skardu sub-district of Ladakh came under Pakistani control. The remainder of the princely state had been organised as a state of India under the name Jammu Kashmir.

Inside India 

The territory under Indian control include:
Jammu Division: districts of Jammu, Kathua, Udhampur, Reasi; the jagirs of Chenani and Bhaderwah; 11 per cent of the Mirpur district and 40 per cent of the Poonch jagir.
 Kashmir Division: Kashmir South (Anantnag) and Kashmir North (Baramulla); 13 per cent of the Muzaffarabad district.
 Ladakh Division: Kargil and Leh districts. (Became the union territory of Ladakh on 31 October 2019.)

The districts were reorganised by 1968, breaking up some of the larger districts. In 2006, eight new districts were created: Kishtwar, Ramban, Reasi, Samba, Bandipora, Ganderbal, Kulgam and Shopian.

In August 2019, the Jammu and Kashmir Reorganisation Act was passed by both houses of the Indian Parliament. The provisions contained in the bill reorganised the state of Jammu and Kashmir into two union territories; Jammu and Kashmir (union territory) and Ladakh with effect from 31 October 2019.

Districts

Jammu Division

Kashmir Division

References

Bibliography 
 
 
 
Larson, Gerald James. "India's Agony Over Religion", 1995, page 245

External links 

Jammu and Kashmir district portal

 
Districts
Jammu And Kashmir